Pinecliffe is a U.S. Post Office and an unincorporated community located in Boulder County and Gilpin County, Colorado, United States.  The Pinecliffe Post Office, in Boulder County, has the ZIP Code 80471.

Geography
Pinecliffe is located at  (39.931591,-105.428753).

Gallery

References

Unincorporated communities in Boulder County, Colorado
Unincorporated communities in Gilpin County, Colorado
Unincorporated communities in Colorado